Titus Awakes is the editorial title applied to a novel being planned by Mervyn Peake at the time he became too ill to write, about 1960. It was to have been the fourth novel in the Gormenghast series, after Titus Groan, Gormenghast, and Titus Alone. Titus Awakes remains unfinished, as the author succumbed to illness in 1968 before the work could be completed.

In the 1970s Peake's widow, Maeve Gilmore, wrote a version of Titus Awakes to which she gave the title Search Without End. It runs to 65,000 words, as counted on the typescript that she asked Peter Winnington to comment on. Watney told a slightly different tale.

In 1992 Overlook Press, the American publishers of the Gormenghast series, printed at the end of Titus Alone the existing coherent portions of Mervyn Peake's Titus Awakes, with a brief introduction by John Watney. They consist of three pages from which it is clear that, although Titus has left Gormenghast, the castle remains active in his memory and important in the story. Although Peake wrote further passages, the editors were unable to decipher them.

Critical reception
This unfinished work is not well-known even among readers of Peake's other works, having been published only in the Overlook editions (albeit in both single volume and omnibus). Mills (2005) comments on the irony of the narrator's comment that Titus would never again see Gormenghast Castle, for "even in the first proposed chapter, Titus returns in a dream to Gormenghast and the fight between Swelter and Flay." The textual repetition in the preadventure was commented upon by Chris Sandow, who stated that "[t]he fragments are clearly no more than early drafts". However, it is not clear that the repetition is an error.

Continued manuscript
Early in 2010 Sebastian Peake announced that his daughter had found Maeve Gilmore's notebook MS of Titus Awakes in the family's attic. It follows Titus's journeyings in the wider world and his arrival at an island that Peake identifies as Sark, where the Peake family lived from 1946 to 1949. Finally, Titus becomes Mervyn Peake. The book was published by Overlook Press as Titus Awakes: The Lost Book of Gormenghast in June 2011 to coincide with the 100th anniversary of Mervyn Peake's birth.

References

Unfinished novels
Novels published posthumously
Gormenghast
1960 fantasy novels
Weird fiction novels
The Overlook Press books